Reaping the Whirlwind may refer to:
 "Reaping the Whirlwind", a song by Buckethead from Funnel Weaver
 Reaping the Whirlwind, a novel by Rosey Dow, winner of a 2001 Christy Award
 Reaping the Whirlwind, a 1908 play by Allan Monkhouse
 Reaping the Whirlwind: A Christian Interpretation of History, a 1976 book by Langdon Brown Gilkey

See also
 Reap the whirlwind (disambiguation)